Phú Hưng may refer to several places in Vietnam, including:

Phú Hưng, Bến Tre, a commune of Bến Tre city
Phú Hưng, Cà Mau, a commune of Cái Nước District
Phú Hưng, An Giang, a commune of Phú Tân District, An Giang